The 1920 Illinois lieutenant gubernatorial election was held on November 2, 1920. It saw Republican nominee Fred E. Sterling win a landslide victory.

Primary elections
Primary elections were held on September 15, 1920.

Democratic primary

Candidates
Leo G. Hana, soldier and former director of athletics at the University of Illinois
Walter W. Williams, former State Representative

Results

Republican primary

Candidates
William H. H. Miller, state legislator
Fred E. Sterling, incumbent State Treasurer

Results

Socialist primary

Candidates
George Koop

Results

General election

Candidates

Major candidates
Walter W. Williams, Democratic
Fred E. Sterling, Republican

Minor candidates
Charles Dold, Farmer-Labor, executive board member of the Chicago Federation of Labor
Clay Freeman Gaumer, Prohibition, Prohibition nominee for U.S. House in 1916 from Illinois's at-large congressional district
Arthur D. Foyer, Single Tax
George Koop, Socialist, Socialist nominee for U.S. House in 1906 and 1908 from Illinois's 7th congressional district
Cornelius W. Stapleton, Socialist Labor

Results

See also
1920 Illinois gubernatorial election

References

Bibliography

1920
Lieutenant gubernatorial
Illinois
November 1920 events in the United States